Joftan (also Romanized as Joftān and Jaftān; also known as Jaghtān) is a village in Rudbar Rural District, in the Central District of Tafresh County, Markazi Province, Iran. At the 2006 census, its population was 182, in 73 families.

References 

Populated places in Tafresh County